Odd "Ivers" Iversen (6 November 1945 – 29 December 2014) was a Norwegian footballer who played as a striker; he is notable for his former record of 158 goals in Norwegian top tier football, as well as his still-standing record of 30 goals in a single season.

Career
Iversen began his career in Rosenborg in 1964, and would spend twelve of his eighteen years as a top tier footballer in the club. He is often regarded as one of the greatest Norwegian footballers ever, and was the top goalscorer four times in the Norwegian top division (1967, 1968, 1969 and 1979). Upon retirement in 1982, he became the first Norwegian player in history to get a testimonial match by his club (Rosenborg).

At the time of his death he still held the record of most goals scored in one season (30 goals in 18 matches), a record that as of November 2020 still stands. During his career as a footballer he scored 158 goals in the top division, a record that stood for more than 20 years until it was broken by Petter Belsvik (159) in 2003. Since then, Harald Martin Brattbakk (166) and Sigurd Rushfeldt (172) have also passed Iversen in the all-time goalscoring chart.

In addition to Rosenborg, Iversen also played for Vålerenga and Racing Mechelen in Belgium. He also got 45 caps and 19 goals for the Norway national team.

Personal life and death
Odd Iversen was born and grew up in Trondheim in the working class neighborhood of Møllenberg. He is the father of former professional footballer Steffen Iversen. He died in Trondheim in the early hours of 29 December 2014 from an unspecified illness, aged 69.

Honours
Rosenborg
Norwegian top division: 1967, 1969

Individual
Norwegian top division top scorer: 1967, 1968, 1969, 1979

References

External links

1945 births
2014 deaths
Norwegian footballers
Norway international footballers
Rosenborg BK players
K.R.C. Mechelen players
Vålerenga Fotball players
Norwegian expatriate footballers
Expatriate footballers in Belgium
Norwegian expatriate sportspeople in Belgium
Eliteserien players
Footballers from Trondheim
Association football forwards
Rosenborg BK non-playing staff